Baryshivka Raion (translit.: Baryshivs’kyi raion) was a raion in east-central Kyiv Oblast (province) of Ukraine. Its administrative center was the urban-type settlement of Baryshivka. The raions area totaled 957.6 km². The raion was formerly known as Baryshivska Rairada from 1923 to 1963. The raion was abolished on 18 July 2020 as part of the administrative reform of Ukraine, which reduced the number of raions of Kyiv Oblast to seven. The area of Baryshivka Raion was merged into Brovary Raion.

Geography
Baryshivka Raion was located in the east-central area of Kyiv Oblast, and had a total area of 957.6 km² (about 3.46 % of the total oblast's territory).

Water covered about 10 km² of raion. Through the raion flowed the tributaries of the Dnieper: Trubizh, Krasylivka, Ilta, and the Nedra rivers. Baryshivka Raion bordered the following raions: Boryspil and Yahotyn raions of Kyiv Oblast on the west, Yahotyn raion on the east, Zghurivka raion of Kyiv Oblast and Bobrovytsia raion of Chernihiv Oblast on the north, and Pereiaslav-Khmelnytskyi raion on the south.

Demographics
The urban population of Baryshivka Raion included 11,300 people, and rural population included 29,700 people. The number of pensioners totaled 12,800, about 31.1% of the total population of the raion. The density of the raion's population was 42.9 p/km². The birth rate for the raion was 4 children per 1,000 inhabitants, and the mortality rate is 15 people per 1,000 inhabitants.

The ethnic composition was: Ukrainians 38,700 people (94.2 %), Russians 2,000 people (4.8 %), Belarusians 200 people (0.5 %) and others combined total 200 people (0.5 %).

Subdivisions
At the time of disestablishment, the raion consisted of one hromada, Baryshivka settlement hromada with the administration in the urban-type settlement of Baryshivka.

Baryshivka Raion consisted of 1 urban-type settlement (selyshche mis’koho typu), Baryshivka; and 38 villages (selo). The settlements of Baryshivka Raion were:

 Baryshivka
 Bilshovyk
 Borschiv
 Bziv
 Chervonoarmiiske
 Dernivka
 Hostroluchchia
 Hryhorivka
 Khlopkiv
 Khmelovyk
 Korniivka
 Korzhi
 Lekhnivka
 Leliaky
 Lukashi
 Lukianivka
 Mala Tarasivka
 Maskivtsi
 Morozivka
 Nedra
 Paryshkiv
 Pasichna
 Peremoha
 Podillia
 Pylypcha
 Rudnytske
 Sadove
 Selychivka
 Selysche
 Semenivka
 Sezenkiv
 Shovkove
 Shvachykha
 Ustynkova Hreblia
 Veselynivka
 Vlasivka
 Voloshynivka
 Yabluneve
 Yareshky

See also
 Administrative divisions of Kyiv Oblast

References

External links

 Verkhovna Rada website  - Administrative divisions of the Baryshivka Raion  
 baryshivka.org.ua  - site of the city Baryshivka 

Former raions of Kyiv Oblast
1965 establishments in the Soviet Union
Ukrainian raions abolished during the 2020 administrative reform